Reddyanus besucheti is a species of scorpion in the family Buthidae endemic to Sri Lanka.

Description
Total length is 30 to 45 mm. Male has slightly longer metasomal segments and telson than female. Pedipalp segments have same length in both sexes, but the pedipalp chela is wider in male. Pedipalps and legs have brown maculation, which is identical on femur and patella as well. The first metasomal segment has 10 carinae, whereas second through fourth segments have eight carinae. The fifth segment consists with five carinae in female but it reduced to three to five in
male. Subaculear tooth is wide and rounded. There are 12 to 18 pectinal teeth in both sexes. Sexual dimorphism is visible after the last molt. Identification of immature males and females is difficult, but can be separated by observing pectines. Pectines are longer and larger in males than in females. Also, male pectines have more teeth than female pectines.

After a single insemination, adult female can gives birth to from three to five broods in captivity. Average littler size for a brood ranges from 10 to 17 juveniles. Young scorpions remain with their mother until their first molt. After the first moult, they start to disperse. The first molt took place about 6 days after the birth. Subsequent molts usually take place at different ages, on average 59, 112, 168 and 235 days. The duration of postembryonic development ranges from 6.6 to 10.5 months. Adult lifespan is about 24 to 35 months.

References

besucheti
Animals described in 1982